The 2022 Arizona Superintendent of Public Instruction election took place on November 8, 2022, to elect the Superintendent of Public Instruction of Arizona. Incumbent Democratic Superintendent Kathy Hoffman was defeated in her run for a second term by former Republican Attorney General Tom Horne.

Democratic primary

Candidates

Nominee 
 Kathy Hoffman, incumbent superintendent

Results

Republican primary

Candidates

Nominee 
Tom Horne, former superintendent and former Arizona Attorney General

Eliminated in primary 
Shiry Sapir, real estate manager
Michelle Udall, state representative from the 25th district

Did not file 
 Michael Trevillion, assistant principal

Polling

Results

Libertarian primary

Candidates

Eliminated in primary 
 Sheila Reid-Shaver, Maricopa County precinct committeeman (write-in)

Results

General election

Polling

Certified results

Recount
On December 5, 2022, following election certification, Secretary of State Katie Hobbs petitioned the Maricopa County Superior Court to initiate a recount for the Superintendent of Public Instruction election. On the same day, Maricopa County Superior Court Judge Timothy J. Thomason ordered for the recount to begin. Although, Superintendent Kathy Hoffman had already conceded the election, the recount proceeded as the margin between the two candidates was 0.35%, which falls in the threshold to trigger an automatic recount.

On December 29, Judge Timothy Thomason announced the results of the recount, confirming Tom Horne as the winner with an increased margin of 9,188 votes.

Recount results

See also
2022 Arizona elections

Notes

References 

Superintendent of public instruction
Arizona
Arizona Superintendent of Public Instruction elections